Leandro Damián Marcelo Grimi (born 9 February 1985) is an Argentine professional footballer who plays as a left-back.

Club career

Early years and Milan
Born in San Lorenzo, Santa Fe, Grimi played for Club Atlético Huracán and Racing Club de Avellaneda in his homeland, appearing in 11 Primera División matches with the latter. In January 2007, the 22-year-old was signed by Italian club A.C. Milan for €2 million.

After taking part in a friendly with Birkirkara F.C. in the team's training camp in Malta, Grimi's competitive debut for the Rossoneri took place against A.C. Arezzo in a 2–0 win in that season's Coppa Italia. On 18 April 2007 he made his first appearance in Serie A, playing the last 12 minutes of a 5–2 victory at Ascoli Calcio 1898.

Grimi spent the first half of the 2007–08 campaign on loan to fellow league side A.C. Siena.

Sporting CP
Grimi joined Sporting CP in January 2008, also on loan. He played 20 official games in his first year – nine in the Primeira Liga – as his team finished in second position and also won the Taça de Portugal, with him featuring the full 120 minutes in a 2–0 extra time defeat of FC Porto.

On 13 July 2008, Milan announced Sporting had acquired Grimi on a permanent basis. He agreed to a five-year contract, with the Lisbon club paying the Italians €2.5 million plus 35% of a future transfer fee (Sporting was also able to acquire 5% of the player's rights for €200,000 every time it qualified for the UEFA Champions League). His minimum-fee release clause amounted to €25m.

After the arrival of Evaldo from S.C. Braga in the 2010 off-season, Grimi became a fringe player, making just four overall appearances during the season – two in the league, for a total of 253 minutes – and being loaned in the very last day of the 2011 summer transfer window to K.R.C. Genk in the Belgian Pro League.

Late career
After leaving the Estádio José Alvalade in June 2013 as a free agent, Grimi represented Godoy Cruz Antonio Tomba, Racing Club de Avellaneda and Newell's Old Boys, always in his country's top flight.

Honours
Sporting CP
Taça de Portugal: 2007–08
Supertaça Cândido de Oliveira: 2008

Racing
Argentine Primera División: 2014

References

External links
Racing Club official profile 

1985 births
Living people
People from San Lorenzo Department
Argentine people of Italian descent
Sportspeople from Santa Fe Province
Argentine footballers
Association football defenders
Argentine Primera División players
Club Atlético Huracán footballers
Racing Club de Avellaneda footballers
Godoy Cruz Antonio Tomba footballers
Newell's Old Boys footballers
Serie A players
A.C. Milan players
A.C.N. Siena 1904 players
Primeira Liga players
Sporting CP footballers
Belgian Pro League players
K.R.C. Genk players
Argentine expatriate footballers
Expatriate footballers in Italy
Expatriate footballers in Portugal
Expatriate footballers in Belgium
Argentine expatriate sportspeople in Italy
Argentine expatriate sportspeople in Portugal
Argentine expatriate sportspeople in Belgium